Olivia Van der Jagt (born July 7, 1999) is an American professional soccer player who plays as a midfielder for OL Reign of the National Women's Soccer League (NWSL).

Youth career
Van der Jagt played youth soccer and volleyball starting at the age of 4, playing for Dos FC; PacNW; Eastside FC of Issaquah, Washington, where she won two Washington state championships; and the Kentridge High School Chargers of Kent, Washington. She was selected to the 2016 NSCAA All-America Team. Parallel to her soccer career, she also played volleyball until her sophomore year of high school.

Collegiate career
Van der Jagt chose the University of Washington Huskies over other Pac-12 universities. She scored 12 goals and 9 assists in her collegiate career as a midfielder, and was selected to the All-Pac-12 third team in 2021. After starting four matches in her freshman season, she became a regular starter for the Huskies.

Club career

Seattle Sounders Women
Van der Jagt played for the amateur Seattle Sounders Women from 2016 to 2019 while attending the University of Washington and won the WPSL championship in 2018.

OL Reign
OL Reign selected Van der Jagt with the 33rd-overall pick in the third round of the 2022 NWSL Draft, and signed her to a one-year contract on March 18, 2022. She debuted for OL Reign on April 14, 2022, during the 2022 NWSL Challenge Cup against San Diego Wave FC and scored her first professional goal in stoppage time against Angel City FC three days later, a game-winning goal that secured OL Reign's semifinals berth in the tournament.

Honors
 with OL Reign
 NWSL Shield: 2022
 The Women's Cup: 2022

Personal life
Van der Jagt's father, Gerard, played for the Suriname national volleyball team.

References

External links
 
 
 

1999 births
Living people
Sportspeople from Kent, Washington
Soccer players from Washington (state)
American women's soccer players
Washington Huskies women's soccer players
OL Reign draft picks
OL Reign players
National Women's Soccer League players
American people of Surinamese descent
Sportspeople of Surinamese descent
Women's association football midfielders